Pokagon (YTB-836) is a United States Navy  named for Chief Leopold Pokagon of the Pokagon Band of Potawatomi Indians.  Pokagon is the third US Navy ship to bear the name.

Construction

The contract for Pokagon was awarded 5 June 1973. She was laid down on 22 October 1974 at Marinette, Wisconsin, by Marinette Marine and launched 9 April 1975. Pokagon was the last ship of the Natick-class to be built.

Operational history

Pokagon has served Naval Station Mare Island, Vallejo, California and Naval Station Everett, Washington and is currently in service there.

References

External links
 

 

Natick-class large harbor tugs
Ships built by Marinette Marine
1975 ships